Fidenae was an ancient town of Latium, situated about 8 km north of Rome on the Via Salaria, which ran between Rome and the Tiber.  Its inhabitants were known as Fidenates.  As the Tiber was the border between Etruria and Latium, the left-bank settlement of Fidenae represented an extension of Etruscan presence into Latium. The site of the arx of the ancient town was probably on the hill on which lies the contemporary Villa Spada, though no traces of early buildings or defences are to be seen; pre-Roman tombs are in the cliffs to the north. The later village lay at the foot of the hill on the eastern edge of the high-road, and its curia, with a dedicatory inscription to Marcus Aurelius by the Senatus Fidenatium, was excavated in 1889. Remains of other buildings may also be seen.

History

Conflicts with the Roman kingdom
Originally a settlement of Etruscans, it was for some while the frontier of the Roman territory and from time to time changed hands between Rome and Veii.

In the 8th century BC during the reign of Rome's first king, Romulus, the Fidenates and the Veientes were defeated in a war with Rome, according to legend.  It may be that a colony was established there after the defeat as Livy afterwards describes Fidenae as a Roman colony.

Fidenae and Veii were defeated by Rome in the mid 7th century BC during the reign of Rome's third king Tullus Hostilius, and again by Rome's fifth king Tarquinius Priscus in the early 6th century BC.

Conflicts with the Roman republic
In the early Roman republic Fidenae made a decision that was to cost them much of their land in favor of the new Claudia gens, formed from Sabine defectors. Lucius Tarquinius Superbus, last king of Rome, having been expelled from it, at first looked for intervention from the Etruscans. Lars Porsenna of Clusium, dissatisfied with Superbus' conduct and ethics, made peace with the new republic.

The Tarquins then subverted Latium. Sextus Tarquinius, whose rape of Lucretia had triggered the overthrow of the monarchy (if he was not assassinated at Gabii), convinced the Sabines to go to war against Rome, arguing that previous treaties had been annulled by the expulsion of the kings. The Tarquins were now interested in Latin intervention. After some minor conflicts in which Rome was victorious, the Sabines took a vote and resolved on an invasion of the city of Rome (with perhaps the previous example in memory). The Tarquins brought in Fidenae and Cameria, formerly Roman allies.

The total defeat of the Sabines in 505/504 BC was followed by the siege of Fidenae. The city was taken only a few days later: the Romans assembled their prisoners and executing the senior officers before them (whipped by the rods and beheaded by the axe of the fasces, a standard punishment for treason), let the rest go with a stern warning. A garrison was placed in Fidenae, and its members were given much of its land. The Claudii are not mentioned in connection with the battle, but they had been given land north of the Anio river, some of which was at Fidenae. They could only collect on that offer if Fidenae was defeated, the implication being that they were being invited to participate in the campaign; they may even have been the garrison.

Fidenae appears to have fallen permanently under Roman domination after its capture in 435 BC by the Romans, and is spoken of by classical authors as a place almost deserted in their time. It seems, however, to have had some importance as a post station.

Stadium disaster
In 27 AD, an apparently cheaply built wooden amphitheater constructed by an entrepreneur named Atilius collapsed in Fidenae, resulting in by far the worst stadium disaster in history. At least 20,000 were killed and many more injured out of the total audience of 50,000.

The emperor Tiberius had banned gladiatorial games, it seems, and when the prohibition was lifted, the public had flocked to the earliest events, so a large crowd was present when the stadium collapsed. At the time of the incident, Tiberius was in Capri, where he had a secure getaway, but he rushed to Fidenae to assist the victims of this incident.

The Roman Senate responded to the tragedy by banning people with a fortune of less than 400,000 sesterces from hosting gladiator shows, and also requiring that all amphitheaters  built in the future be erected on a sound foundation, inspected and certified for soundness. The government also "banished" Atilius.

See also
 Roman–Etruscan Wars

References

Further reading

Roman sites in Lazio
Former populated places in Italy